is a railway station located in the city of Hashima, Gifu Prefecture,  Japan, operated by the private railway operator Meitetsu.

Lines

Station layout  
Egira Station has one ground-level side platform serving a single bi-directional track.

Adjacent stations

History
Egira Station opened on April 1, 1929. The station was closed in 1943, and was not reopened until December 11, 1982.

Surrounding area
Chuo Elementary School

See also
 List of Railway Stations in Japan

External links

References

Railway stations in Japan opened in 1929
Stations of Nagoya Railroad
Railway stations in Gifu Prefecture
Hashima, Gifu